Georg Ludwig Friedrich Laves (17 December 1788 – 30 April 1864) was a German architect, civil engineer and urban planner. Born in Uslar, Lower Saxony, he lived and worked primarily in the city of Hanover and also died there. He was appointed Oberhofbaudirektor, "court master builder", in 1852. As the leading architect  of the Kingdom of Hanover for a career spanning 50 years, he had great influence on the urban development of this city. Alongside Karl Friedrich Schinkel in Berlin and Leo von Klenze in Munich, Laves was one of the most accomplished neoclassical style architects of Germany. As an engineer he developed a special iron truss lenticular or "fishbelly" beam bridge construction method, the so-called "Lavesbrücke". Laves found his final resting place in the Engesohde Cemetery (Engesohder Friedhof) in Hanover.

Among his most important works are:
 Full reconstruction of the Leineschloss (Leine Palace or Leine Castle), between 1816 and 1844 (severely damaged in World War II and again re-built by Dieter Oesterlen between 1957 and 1962).
 Hanover Opera House, home of the Staatsoper Hannover, built between 1845 and 1852 (severely damaged in World War II and re-built in 1948).
 Wangenheim palace for Count Georg von Wangenheim, built between 1829 and 1832.
 The facade of Herrenhausen Palace (Schloss Herrenhausen) in neoclassical style, about 1820/21 (destroyed in World War II and rebuilt in 2013).
 The Palmenhaus ("Palm-house"), a conservatory in the Berggarten built between 1846 and 1849 (destroyed in World War II). The building housed the most extensive and valuable collection of palms in Europe.
 The mausoleum for King Ernest Augustus, King of Hanover, and his consort Frederica of Mecklenburg-Strelitz in the garden of the Chapel at Schloss Herrenhausen (the mausoleum today is situated in the Berggarten, part of the Herrenhausen Gardens), built between 1842 and 1847.
 Waterloo Square with Waterloo Column, built between 1826 and 1832.
 Some structures designed or remodeled in the landscape garden around the Derneburg Castle near Hildesheim, owned by Count Ernst zu Münster

Gallery

1788 births
1864 deaths
19th-century German architects
People from Uslar
German neoclassical architects
Architects from Hanover